Dine Brands Global Inc. is a publicly traded food and beverage company based in Glendale, California. Founded in 1958 as IHOP, it operates franchised and corporate owned full-service restaurants including two restaurant concepts,  Applebee's Neighborhood Grill & Bar and International House of Pancakes (IHOP).

History
In the late 1950s, Al Lapin Jr. formed a new holding company for the International House of Pancakes chain called International Industries. Eventually the holding company consisted of International House of Pancakes, Orange Julius, Love's Wood Pit Barbecue, Golden Cup Coffee Shops, The Original House of Pies, Wil Wright's Ice Cream Shoppes, and Copper Penny Coffee Shops.

In 1976, International Industries was renamed to IHOP, Inc; and IHOP Corporation was founded as a new holding firm for IHOP, Love's, and OHOP (which was later sold shortly after). In 1979, it was purchased by Wienerwald Holding, the owners of Wienerwald and Lum's chains. Who later declared bankruptcy, and sold IHOP Corp to SVIDO in 1983; who hadn't been involved in the restaurant business prior.

In 1987, IHOP was purchased by a investment group led by Richard K. Herzer; returning IHOP's ownership by an American company. Four years later, the company went public for the first time since 1979.

In 2007, IHOP Corp announced it would be acquiring Applebee's International for approximately $2.1 billion. Following the closing, IHOP Corporation was renamed to DineEquity Inc.; and subsequently announced it would franchise most of Applebee's 500 company-owned locations, and undertake a plan to revitalize the chain's brand and concept.

In 2018, it was renamed to Dine Brands Global.

As of December 31, 2019, Dine Brands had 3,628 restaurants including 1,787 Applebee's and 1,841 IHOP restaurants, including 69 Applebee's that are company owned, 161 IHOP restaurants that are owned by area licensees and 3,398 franchised restaurants including 1,718 Applebee's and 1,680 IHOP restaurants.

In December 2022, they acquired Fuzzy's Taco Shop for $80 million in cash, adding 138 restaurants in 18 states.

References

External links
 

Companies listed on the New York Stock Exchange
Multinational food companies
Restaurant groups in the United States
Food and drink companies of the United States
Companies based in Glendale, California
1958 establishments in California
Food and drink companies established in 1958
American companies established in 1958